Titurkandi is a village in Tagarbanda Union, Alfadanga Upazila, Faridpur District, Bangladesh. There is one primary school, one madrasa, one community hospital, two mosques, four temples and one Union Office.

References 

Populated places in Dhaka Division
Villages in Faridpur District
Villages in Dhaka Division